Bream is a surname. Notable people with the surname include:

Freda Bream (1918–1996), New Zealand novelist 
Henry T. Bream (1899–1990), American minor league baseball player
Julian Bream (1933–2020), British classical guitarist and lutenist
Shannon Bream (born 1970), American journalist and attorney
Sid Bream (born 1960), American baseball player